This is a list of the Italy national football team results from its origin in 1910 to 1929. During this period, Italy achieved the bronze medal at the 1928 Olympic football tournament.

Results

1910

1911

1912

1913

1914

1915

1920

1921

1922

1923

1924

1925

1926

1927

1928

1929

1Indicates new coach / Technical Commission

External links
Italy - International Matches 1910-1915 on RSSSF.com
Italy - International Matches 1920-1929 on RSSSF.com

1910s in Italy
1920s in Italy
Italy national football team results